Phenylobacterium deserti is a Gram negative, aerobic and motile bacterium from the genus of Phenylobacterium which has been isolated from desert soil from the Cholistan Desert in Pakistan.

References

Caulobacterales
Bacteria described in 2017